The Zuelke Building is a twelve-story, 168 foot neo-gothic high rise building in Appleton, Wisconsin. It is named for Irving Zuelke. It was completed in 1932, and was added to the National Register of Historic Places in 1982 as part of the College Avenue Historic District. It is located at 103 West College Avenue.

References

External links
 Zuelke Building official website

Historic district contributing properties in Wisconsin
Appleton, Wisconsin
Buildings and structures in Appleton, Wisconsin
National Register of Historic Places in Outagamie County, Wisconsin
Commercial buildings on the National Register of Historic Places in Wisconsin
Commercial buildings completed in 1932
1932 establishments in Wisconsin
Skyscrapers in Wisconsin
Skyscraper office buildings in Wisconsin